Krishnan Srinivasan (born 15 February 1937) is a retired Indian diplomat, historian, author, former Indian Foreign Secretary, and Deputy Secretary-General of the Commonwealth of Nations .

He was born in Madras, India and educated at Bedford School and Christ Church, Oxford. He joined the Indian Foreign Service in May 1959. His early postings included Oslo, Beirut, and Tripoli. He was India's Ambassador/High Commissioner to Zambia and Botswana, Nigeria, Benin and Cameroon, the Netherlands and Bangladesh. He was appointed Secretary and finally Foreign Secretary and retired in 1995. In 1995, he was appointed Commonwealth Deputy Secretary-General for Political Affairs in London where he served until 2002.

He was a Member of Christ Church, Oxford’s Senior Common Room and High Table from 1998 to 2016, Fellow of Wolfson College, Cambridge (2002–05), Fellow of the Centre for International Studies Cambridge (2002–05), Fellow of the Institute of Commonwealth Studies London (2002–08), Fellow of the Netherlands Institute of Advanced Studies (2003–04), Fellow of the Maulana Abul Kalam Azad Institute of Asian Studies, Kolkata from 2006 to 2015, and Fellow of the Swedish Collegium for Advanced Study at Uppsala in (2008 and 2012–13). He was elected Honorary Professor at ASCI Hyderabad in 2005. He was awarded a Hind Ratna (India) in 2002, and was made a Chevalier de l'Ordre de la Valeur (Cameroon) in 2007.

Bibliography

Non fiction
Tricks of the Trade (2000).
The Rise, Decline and Future of the British Commonwealth.  Hardback (2005).  Paperback (2008).
The Jamdani Revolution; Politics, Personalities and Civil Society in Bangladesh (2007).
Towards the New Horizon: World Order in the 21st Century (2009)
Diplomatic Channels (2012)
Europe in Emerging Asia (2015)
Old Europe, New Asia (2015)
Values in Foreign Policy, Investigating Ideals and Interests (2019)

Fiction
The Eccentric Effect (2001).
The Ugly Ambassador (2003).
Guesswork (2005).
The Invisible African (2012)
Ambassador Marco's Indian Instincts (2016)
The Ambassador and the Private Eye (2021)

Newspapers
He is a regular columnist and book reviewer on international affairs for several Indian newspapers.

References

Who's Who, A & C Black, London 2020 and subsequent issues;
The International Who's Who, Routledge, London 2015 and subsequent issues.

Indian Foreign Secretaries
Ambassadors of India to Zambia
Ambassadors of India to Botswana
Ambassadors of India to Nigeria
Ambassadors of India to Benin
Ambassadors of India to Cameroon
Ambassadors of India to the Netherlands
Commonwealth Deputy Secretaries-General
Indian civil servants
Commonwealth of Nations experts
Politicians from Chennai
1937 births
Living people
High Commissioners of India to Bangladesh
People educated at Bedford School
Alumni of Christ Church, Oxford